Blackborough End Pit is a  geological Site of Special Scientific Interest  south-east of King's Lynn in  Norfolk. It is a Geological Conservation Review site.

This site is important as a demonstration of erosion during the Lower Cretaceous. The Carstone Formation, which dates to the Albian around 110 million years ago, rests unconformably on the Leziate Beds, which date to the Valanginian, over 130 million years ago, and the normally intervening Dersingham Beds are missing.

The site is private land with no public access.

References

Sites of Special Scientific Interest in Norfolk
Geological Conservation Review sites